Ancón may refer to:

Places
Antiquity
Ancon (Picenum), town of ancient Picenum, now in Italy
Ancon (Pontus), town of ancient Pontus, now in Turkey

Ecuador
Ancón, Ecuador, a city in Guayas, Ecuador

Panama
Ancón, Panama, a city in central Panama
Ancon Hill, a hill overlooking Panama City

Peru
Ancon (archaeological site)
Ancón District, a district of Peru

Ships
, a sidewheel paddle steamer that was wrecked in Alaska in 1889
Ancon (1894), a steel-hulled three-masted barque that was scrapped in 1921
, the first steamship officially to transit the 1901 in 1914
, a 1939 steamship that was a AGC-4 troopship

Other
Treaty of Ancón, signed by Peru and Chile on 20 October 1883
ANCON, a conservation group in Panama
Ancon, a UK company that makes steel products for the construction industry
Ancon sheep, an extinct breed of sheep